Anaheim Canyon station is a Metrolink train station in Anaheim, California, United States, served by the Inland Empire–Orange County Line. The station is adjacent to the Anaheim Canyon industrial and professional area. It is also a stop for Orange County Transportation Authority buses.

In 2021, work began on improvements including a  second track with a second passenger platform. The project also includes an extension of the existing passenger platform and improvements to grade crossings at nearby La Palma Avenue and North Tustin Avenue. The second track and new platform were completed in 2023.

References

External links 

 "MetroLink Adds Later Evening Train to Inland Empire" - Los Angeles Times
 "Agenda" - Los Angeles Times
 "Train collision near LA kills one, hurts 265" - The Deseret News
 "Ocean-bound residents flock to train for access" - The Press Enterprise
 "Trains collide in California" - The Free Lance Star

Transportation in Anaheim, California
Metrolink stations in Orange County, California
Bus stations in Orange County, California
Railway stations in the United States opened in 1996
1996 establishments in California